Esteban Valencia may refer to:
 Esteban Valencia (footballer, born 1972)
 Esteban Valencia (footballer, born 1999)